Piz Languard is a mountain of the Livigno Alps, overlooking Pontresina in the canton of Graubünden. The summit can be accessed via a trail from the heights of Pontresina and is a popular goal for hikers. A privately owned mountain hut named Chamanna Georgy is located at 3,175 metres.

References

External links

 Piz Languard on Hikr
 Piz Languard on Summitpost

Mountains of Switzerland
Mountains of Graubünden
Mountains of the Alps
Alpine three-thousanders
La Punt Chamues-ch
Pontresina